The Ougeotte is a  river in the department of Haute-Saône in the region of Bourgogne-Franche-Comté in eastern France. It is a sub-tributary of the Rhône via the Saône.

Geography 
The Ougeotte rises in Ouge, which gives its name to the river. It flows generally east, receiving the Gailley at Chauvirey-le-Vieil, then the Écrevisses stream on the right of the ancient Agneaucourt mill, then joining the Saône at Gevigney-et-Mercey, near  Montureux-lès-Baulay.

Nowadays there are no more mills which take power from the Ougeotte, while at the beginning of the 19th century there were many:
 Ouge: le Moulinot
 Chauvirey: le Bouvot, le Maublanc, la Guerelle, le Grand Moulin
 Montigny-lès-Cherlieu: Montigny, Agneaucourt, and on the tributary stream: le Ferry and le Battant
 Noroy
 Bougey: la Perrière
 Gevigney: Vachez, le Moulin Neuf
 Montureux-lès-Baulay

In the 1840s, the Ougeotte was populated by burbot, pike, eel and perch. By 1960, it was fished for trout and crayfish.

See also
 List of rivers of France

References 

Rivers of France
Rivers of Bourgogne-Franche-Comté
Rivers of Haute-Saône